Derek Gardner may refer to:
 Derek Gardner (painter)
 Derek Gardner (designer)

See also
 Derrick Gardner, American jazz trumpeter